Grandview is an unincorporated community in Rhea County, Tennessee, United States. Grandview's ZIP code is 37337.

Education
Rhea County Schools is the local school district. The district's sole high school is Rhea County High School.

References

Unincorporated communities in Rhea County, Tennessee
Unincorporated communities in Tennessee